Hadiabad (also romanized as Hādīābād) is a village in Mohammadabad Rural District, in the Central District of Anbarabad County, Kerman Province, Iran. At the 2006 census, its population was 852, in 161 families.

References 

Populated places in Anbarabad County